Carlos Eduardo Marangon (born 2 February 1963), best known as Edu Marangon or as Edu, is a retired Brazilian football player and manager, who played as a midfielder.

Playing career
Edu Marangon started his career with Portuguesa, joining Flamengo, after a spell with Italian club Torino. He played 15 games for Flamengo. Edu Marangon played 54 games and scored nine goals as a Palmeiras player.

Managerial career
He started a managerial career in 1999, as Internacional-SP manager. He managed Paraná Clube in 2003, Juventus in 2005, 2007, and 2009, and Rio Claro in 2008.

Career statistics

Club

International

References

External links

1963 births
Living people
Brazilian footballers
Brazilian expatriate footballers
Brazilian football managers
Club Nacional de Football players
CR Flamengo footballers
Sociedade Esportiva Palmeiras players
Santos FC players
Coritiba Foot Ball Club players
Associação Portuguesa de Desportos players
Sport Club Internacional players
Associação Atlética Internacional (Limeira) players
Clube Atlético Bragantino players
Campeonato Brasileiro Série A players
Torino F.C. players
Serie A players
Expatriate footballers in Italy
FC Porto players
Primeira Liga players
J1 League players
Yokohama Flügels players
Expatriate footballers in Japan
Expatriate footballers in Uruguay
Brazil international footballers
1987 Copa América players
Clube Atlético Juventus managers
Guaratinguetá Futebol managers
Clube Atlético Sorocaba managers
Pan American Games gold medalists for Brazil
Association football midfielders
Pan American Games medalists in football
Footballers at the 1987 Pan American Games
Medalists at the 1987 Pan American Games
Footballers from São Paulo
Associação Atlética Internacional (Limeira) managers
Associação Portuguesa de Desportos managers
Paraná Clube managers
Vila Nova Futebol Clube managers
Associação Atlética Portuguesa (Santos) managers